Mr. Miyagi (June 9, 1925 – November 15, 2011) is a fictional character in the original films (1984-1994) of the Karate Kid franchise. He is a karate master (portrayed by Pat Morita) who mentors Daniel LaRusso and Julie Pierce. Although he died in 2011, Miyagi is frequently referenced in the series Cobra Kai (2018–present), which is itself thematically structured via The Miyagi-Verse (characters who knew Mr. Miyagi).

Overview

Name
Mr. Miyagi's given name is inconsistent in the series. In The Karate Kid, the name Hideo Miyagi, which translates to "hero" Miyagi and is the real given name of Pat Morita's brother, can be seen stamped in reverse on his World War II dog tags, being used as a keychain for the car he gives Daniel as a birthday present. As written in Japanese characters in The Karate Kid Part II, his name is 宮城成義 (Miyagi Nariyoshi), which translates as Nariyoshi Miyagi, which is also seen on his gravestone in Cobra Kai (season 1), Episode 5. He is called Keisuke Miyagi at the start of The Next Karate Kid.

1925-WWII
Mr. Miyagi's ancestor was Shimpo Miyagi, who in 1625 accidentally landed in China. He returned to Okinawa many years later with a wife, children, and the art of Karate. Once back in Okinawa, he developed the style of Karate specific to the Miyagi family.

Mr. Miyagi was born on June 9, 1925, in Tomi Village Okinawa, Japan. He had a job working for his best friend Sato's father, who was the richest man in the village. In addition, he learned karate and fishing from his father Miyagi Chōjun, a fisherman. Breaking family tradition, his father also taught karate to Sato (as Karate was traditionally only passed down from father to son).

Their friendship soured when they were teenagers, however, because Miyagi fell in love with Yukie, a young woman from one of the poorest families in the village. However, her marriage had already been arranged to Sato. Miyagi rebelled against convention and declared his love for Yukie in a public speech. Dishonored by their love, Sato challenged Miyagi to a fight to the death.

Rather than fight his friend, Miyagi secretly left Okinawa, and emigrated to Hawaii where he worked as a farm laborer in the Hawaiian cane fields. While working in the cane fields, he met a young woman who would become his wife.

World War II period
He and his wife were later interned in the Manzanar Japanese-American internment camp at the onset of World War II. During this time, Miyagi joined the U.S. Army and received the Medal of Honor. He was a member of the 442nd Regimental Combat Team, historically the most highly decorated regiment, for its size, of the United States Armed Forces, including 21 Medal of Honor recipients (at the time of the Karate Kid film series, there was only one regiment member awarded the Medal of Honor—Sadao S. Munemori, who received it posthumously in 1946; 20 other regiment members were upgraded from the Distinguished Service Cross in 2000). During this time, his commanding officer  Lieutenant Jack Pierce saved his life. As a way of saying "thank you," Miyagi taught him karate (and Pierce taught him ballroom dancing).

While still fighting overseas, he received a telegram informing him that on November 2, 1944, his wife and newborn child (who were still interned at Manzanar) died due to "complications arising from childbirth." Forty years later, when telling the story to Daniel in The Karate Kid, he says that despite being the "Land of the Free" and "Home of the Brave," they died because there were no doctors there to help her.

WWII awards and decorations
Listed below are the medals and service awards displayed on Miyagi's Staff Sergeant's uniform in the first film.

1945-1984
Miyagi never fully recovered from the loss of his wife and child. At some point prior to 1984, he became an apartment complex maintenance man, and built a traditional Japanese garden in the back of his home (which is shown in the opening sequence of Cobra Kai (season 2), Episode 6) where he lived alone. He also restored classic cars.

1984-1994

The Karate Kid (1984)

In 1984, Miyagi (who is now 59 years old) is working as a maintenance man at the South Seas apartment complex Daniel LaRusso and his mother have just moved into. When Daniel throws away his bike after it is damaged in an ambush by Johnny Lawrence (who is jealous that Daniel is dating Ali) and other members of Cobra Kai, Miyagi repairs and returns it. He later rescues Daniel after he is beaten up by the same bullies during a Halloween party, fending off all the attackers easily. When Daniel realizes that Miyagi saved him, he asks to be taught karate. Miyagi initially declines, wanting instead to prevent the bullying entirely. However, a meeting with the arrogant and merciless John Kreese – a former Special Forces veteran running the Cobra Kai dojo and the bullies' sensei – proves largely futile.

Kreese finally consents to a cessation of hostilities until the time of The All-Valley Karate tournament, where Daniel and the bullying Cobra Kai students will compete. For his part, Miyagi agrees to teach Daniel. Miyagi starts Daniel's training with several seemingly non-karate-related house chores, albeit with specific rhythmic patterns: the first day of training sees Daniel waxing Miyagi's various cars; on the second, he sands the wooden floors of Miyagi's house; on the third, he paints a fence with vertical strokes; on the fourth, he paints Miyagi's house with horizontal strokes. Not understanding his mentor's methods, a frustrated Daniel gets upset and threatens to leave, but Miyagi shows him that the chores were in fact training Daniel to block attacks through muscle memory. Miyagi then begins training Daniel in earnest, and the two develop a deep friendship. One night, Daniel comes upon Miyagi drunkenly lamenting the death of both his wife and newborn son during childbirth at Manzanar while he was serving in Europe during World War II. Miyagi's karate teachings also include important life lessons such as personal balance, reflected in the principle that martial arts training is as much about training the spirit as it is about physical techniques.

Miyagi accompanies Daniel to the All-Valley tournament, where Daniel goes on to win in the finals with a proud Miyagi looking on.

The Karate Kid Part II (1986)

This film begins at the moment where the previous one ended. After the end of the All-Valley tournament, Daniel and Miyagi discuss Daniel's future. While walking into the parking lot, Daniel meets his first fans and signs autographs, as Mr. Miyagi tells him it is time to meet his mother and Ali for dinner. However, they are distracted by an argument between Kreese and his students. As Kreese begins to physically attack Johnny Lawrence, Miyagi walks over to him and asks him to end the fight. When Kreese refuses, Miyagi intervenes and pulls Johnny out from Kreese's grip. Kreese then turns his anger towards Miyagi, who dodges his fists, leading Kreese to accidentally break multiple car windows instead. Miyagi eventually subdues Kreese, behaving as if he will kill him. Instead, Miyagi "honks" his nose and throws him to the ground. He and Daniel then leave for dinner.

In 1985, after Daniel's senior prom ends in disaster (he and Ali break up and Mr. Miyagi's car is damaged), Miyagi invites Daniel to stay with him rather than relocating with his mother. However, as they are building his room, a letter comes in the mail informing Miyagi that his father Miyagi Chōjun (who lives in Okinawa) is dying. Mr. Miyagi then makes plans to go to Okinawa, and Daniel decides to use his college funds to join him.

While traveling to Okinawa, Miyagi recounts to Daniel his unfortunate history with Sato and Yukie. Upon arriving, the two are greeted by Sato's nephew Chozen, who drives Miyagi and Daniel to a warehouse where Sato is waiting. Sato tells Miyagi that after Miyagi visits his father, they will fight to the death to restore Sato's honour. Once at the village, Miyagi and Daniel are welcomed by Yukie and her niece, Kumiko. They explain that Sato owns the village's land title and the villagers are forced to rent their property from him. Yukie also reveals that she never married because of her love for Miyagi.

Miyagi's father requests an audience with both Sato and Miyagi and, just before dying, grips their hands together as a final — but ultimately unsuccessful — request that they put aside their differences. Sato, out of respect for his teacher, gives Miyagi three days to mourn before their fight. Daniel supports Miyagi through his grief and Miyagi shows Daniel the secret to his family's karate: a handheld drum that twists back and forth, illustrating a block-and-defence karate move called the "drum technique". After Chozen and his crew vandalize Miyagi's family property and attack Daniel, Miyagi decides to return to California before the situation worsens. Sato then shows up with bulldozers, threatening to destroy the village if Miyagi flees again. Now forced to comply, Miyagi gives in on the condition that Sato signs the land title over to the villagers regardless of the fight's outcome. Sato initially balks at the suggestion but agrees after Miyagi describes it as a "small price to pay" for his honor.

On the day before their fight, a typhoon strikes the village, leaving Sato trapped under the ruins of a dojo toppled by the storm. Miyagi rescues Sato and they hide in a nearby pillbox with Chozen and other village folks. Daniel rushes into the storm after seeing Yuna stuck on top of a bell tower; Sato demands that his nephew help Daniel, but Chozen refuses. Sato assists Daniel himself, after which he disowns Chozen, who runs out into the storm. The next morning, the bulldozers return — to help rebuild the village — while Sato hands over the village's land title and asks forgiveness from Miyagi, who accepts. They later attend an Obon festival at the castle near the village. A vengeful Chozen takes Kumiko hostage and challenges Daniel to a fight to the death. Miyagi and others in the festival begin using handheld drums to motivate Daniel, inspiring him to subdue Chozen and rescue Kumiko. Daniel and Kumiko share a hug to celebrate their victory over Chozen while the villagers cheer for them and Miyagi looks upon Daniel proudly.

The Karate Kid Part III (1989)

This film begins in 1985 at the moment when the previous one ended. Miyagi and Daniel return to California and discover that the South Seas apartment complex has been sold and is being slated for development, leaving Daniel homeless and Miyagi unemployed. Miyagi offers Daniel the choice to stay at his house for a time. Daniel uses his college funding to help Miyagi open up a nursery shop for bonsai trees. Miyagi thanks Daniel by making him a partner in the new business.

Meanwhile, John Kreese is attempting to resurrect Cobra Kai and get revenge on Daniel and Miyagi with the help of his longtime friend, and co-founder of Cobra Kai, Terry Silver, who hires Mike Barnes, a vicious karate expert. Daniel chooses not to defend his title in the next competition, though he continues his training under Miyagi. Silver approaches them and claims that Kreese has died and requests forgiveness for Kreese's behavior. Barnes attempts to goad Daniel into entering the tournament by picking a fight with him that goes badly for Daniel until Miyagi intervenes and fends Barnes off. The two later find that their bonsai trees have been stolen and replaced with an application for the tournament.

To save the store, Daniel and his newly befriended neighbor, Jessica Andrews, decide to collect and sell a valuable bonsai tree that Miyagi had brought back from Okinawa and planted halfway down an ocean basin. However, Barnes returns while Daniel and Jessica ascend uphill, holding them hostage until Daniel agrees to compete in the tournament. Barnes then snaps the tree in half. Daniel takes the broken bonsai tree to Miyagi; he performs triage on the bonsai while confessing that he sold his truck in order to obtain a new stock of trees and that he cannot train Daniel for the tournament.

Daniel accepts training under Silver's brutal conditions and ends up attacking a man at a nightclub by punching him and breaking his nose, after Silver bribed the man into instigating a fight with Daniel. Horrified at seeing what he has become, Daniel apologizes to Miyagi and Jessica soon afterwards. When Daniel decides not to compete after all, Silver unveils his true agenda: Barnes and Kreese appear and attack Daniel. Miyagi intervenes and defends Daniel, agreeing to train him once more. The two repair their friendship and replant the now-healed bonsai tree. At the tournament, Daniel defeats Barnes and shares a hug with Miyagi to celebrate his second tournament victory, while Silver and Kreese speculate that Cobra Kai is finished for good.

The Next Karate Kid (1994)
 
Years later in 1994, Miyagi travels to Arlington National Cemetery for a commendation for Japanese-Americans who fought in the 442nd Regimental Combat Team during World War II. He meets Louisa Pierce, the widow of his commanding officer Jack Pierce, and they both listen to the opening speech given by Senator Daniel Inouye.

When Louisa brings Miyagi to her home in Boston, he meets her granddaughter Julie Pierce. Julie has behavioral and anger problems stemming from both the loss of her parents in an automobile accident and frequent bullying at school by a school security fraternity called the Alpha Elite. Miyagi invites Louisa to stay in his house in Los Angeles to relax, and he himself stays in Boston to act as Julie's caretaker. Julie's issues cause friction at school and with Miyagi; he watches as she attempts to leave and narrowly misses being struck by a car by managing to jump into a tiger crouch onto the hood. Julie explains that she learned rudimentary karate from her father, Jack's son; Jack had taught his son what he learned from Miyagi. After Julie is arrested during a two-week suspension from school, Miyagi uses the remainder of the time to take Julie to a Buddhist monastery. There, he teaches Julie the true ways of karate – balance, coordination, awareness, and respect for all life – and helps her overcome her anger issues. As Julie is preparing for her high school prom, Miyagi teaches her to dance and buys her a dress. While Julie attends the prom, Miyagi goes bowling with the Buddhist monks. Things go awry when Julie and her date, Eric McGowen, come under siege by Colonel Dugan and the Alpha Elite. Eric's car is set on fire and Eric is saved by Julie and Miyagi. The fiasco ends when Miyagi challenges Colonel Dugan to a fight and easily defeats him.

1995-2011
Prior to his death, Mr Miyagi becomes close with Daniel's wife Amanda and his daughter Samantha. In Season 1, Episode 5 of Cobra Kai, Daniel visits Mr. Miyagi's grave. The gravestone reads Nariyoshi Miyagi/June 9, 1925 - November 15, 2011. Mr. Miyagi left his house and all of his belongings to Daniel.

Cobra Kai (2018–)

Although he died in 2011 (prior to the first season of Cobra Kai which began in the fall of 2017), Mr. Miyagi is either frequently referenced, or appears via archival footage throughout the series. Among other details, his gravestone lists him as a member of the famed Japanese-American 442nd Regiment along with a Combat Service Identification Badge and a Medal of Honor. Alongside the marker is a bonsai tree. Daniel regularly comes to visit the grave and trim the bonsai; he considers "a few months" to be a long time between visits.

Commentary
Pat Morita gained particular fame during the 1980s for his work as Mr. Miyagi. In 2015, Mr. Miyagi was inducted into the Fictitious Athlete Hall of Fame in the Contributor Category.

The Karate Kid screenwriter Robert Mark Kamen stated that Mr. Miyagi was named after Chōjun Miyagi, the founder of the Goju-ryu karate style, and that Fumio Demura was the inspiration for the character. The original preferred choice for the role was Toshiro Mifune, who had appeared in the Akira Kurosawa films Rashomon (1950), Seven Samurai (1954), and The Hidden Fortress (1958), but the actor did not speak English. Morita later auditioned for the role, but was initially rejected for the part due to his close association with stand-up comedy, and with the character Arnold from Happy Days. Producer Jerry Weintraub in particular did not want Morita, as he saw him as a comedic actor. Morita eventually tested five times before Weintraub himself offered him the role, ultimately winning it because he grew a beard and patterned his accent after his uncle. After he was cast and although he had been using the name Pat for years, Weintraub suggested that he be billed with his given name to sound "more ethnic."

In the first film, in The Karate Kid (1984), he was nominated for an Academy Award for Best Supporting Actor and a corresponding Golden Globe Award, for his role as the wise karate teacher Mr. Miyagi who taught bullied teenager Daniel LaRusso (Ralph Macchio) the art of Goju-ryu karate . He was recognized as Noriyuki "Pat" Morita at the 57th Academy Awards ceremony. He reprised the role two more times with Macchio in The Karate Kid Part II (1986) and The Karate Kid Part III (1989). In 1994, he starred in The Next Karate Kid with Hilary Swank (as a bullied teenager Julie Pierce) instead of Macchio.

Although Morita died in 2005, Macchio wrote in an imaginary 2022 letter to him that (due to the 2018–present show Cobra Kai) the "legacy of your work and contribution to the world in your portrayal of Mr. Miyagi shines brighter than ever." Cobra Kai itself is structured through the concept of the Miyagi-verse, a phrase which refers to the fact that "anyone who knew Mr. Miyagi" is potentially capable of appearing in the series.

References

External links
Ralph Macchio on His Friend and 'Karate Kid' Costar Pat Morita: His Legacy 'Shines Brighter Than Ever' - People, November 6, 2022
Pat Morita discusses getting cast as Mr. Miyagi in The Karate Kid
Daniel and Mr. Miyagi auditions, 1983
THE KARATE KID 1983 REHEASAL MOVIE PART 5.mov
The Karate Kid: The Lessons Come Together
The Karate Kid II: No Mercy
The Karate Kid II: Mr. Miyagi Fights
The Karate Kid III: Miyagi Makes a Stand
The Next Karate Kid: Julie's Training Scene
The Next Karate Kid: Miyagi Finishes Dugan

Drama film characters
Film characters introduced in 1984
Fictional characters from California
Fictional Gōjū-ryū practitioners
Fictional illeists
Fictional immigrants to the United States
Fictional Japanese American people
Fictional male martial artists
Fictional martial arts trainers
Fictional mechanics
Fictional Medal of Honor recipients
Fictional military personnel in films
Fictional Ryukyuan people
Fictional staff sergeants
Martial artist characters in films
Okinawa Prefecture in fiction
The Karate Kid (franchise) characters
Fictional United States Army personnel
Fictional World War II veterans